This list of chemistry awards is an index to articles about notable awards for chemistry. It includes awards by the Royal Society of Chemistry, the American Chemical Society, the Society of Chemical Industry and awards by other organizations.

Awards of the Royal Society of Chemistry

The Royal Society of the United Kingdom offers a number of awards for chemistry.

Awards of the American Chemical Society

The American Chemical Society of the United States offers a number of awards related to chemistry.

Awards of the Society of Chemical Industry

The Society of Chemical Industry was established in 1881 by scientists, inventors and entrepreneurs. It offers a number of awards related to chemistry.

Other awards

See also

 Lists of awards
 Lists of science and technology awards
 List of biochemistry awards

References

 
Chemistry